Promicrogaster is a genus of braconid wasps in the family Braconidae. There are more than 40 described species in Promicrogaster, found throughout most of the world.

Species
These 46 species belong to the genus Promicrogaster:

 Promicrogaster alexmartinezi Fernandez-Triana & Boudreault, 2016
 Promicrogaster andreyvallejosi Fernandez-Triana & Boudreault, 2016
 Promicrogaster apharea Nixon, 1965
 Promicrogaster apidanus (Nixon, 1965)
 Promicrogaster brandondinartei Fernandez-Triana & Boudreault, 2016
 Promicrogaster briareus (Nixon, 1965)
 Promicrogaster cara Nixon, 1965
 Promicrogaster conopiae (Watanabe, 1934)
 Promicrogaster daniellopezi Fernandez-Triana & Boudreault, 2016
 Promicrogaster daretrizoi Fernandez-Triana & Boudreault, 2016
 Promicrogaster eddycastroi Fernandez-Triana & Boudreault, 2016
 Promicrogaster eimyobandoae Fernandez-Triana & Boudreault, 2016
 Promicrogaster emesa (Nixon, 1965)
 Promicrogaster erigone Nixon, 1965
 Promicrogaster fabiancastroi Fernandez-Triana & Boudreault, 2016
 Promicrogaster fabriciocambroneroi Fernandez-Triana & Boudreault, 2016
 Promicrogaster floridakeys Fernandez-Triana, 2019
 Promicrogaster gainesvillensis Fernandez-Triana, 2019
 Promicrogaster grandicula (Wilkinson, 1929)
 Promicrogaster hillaryvillafuerteae Fernandez-Triana & Boudreault, 2016
 Promicrogaster huachuca Fernandez-Triana, 2019
 Promicrogaster jaymeae Fernandez-Triana, 2019
 Promicrogaster kevinmartinezi Fernandez-Triana & Boudreault, 2016
 Promicrogaster kiralycastilloae Fernandez-Triana & Boudreault, 2016
 Promicrogaster leilycastilloae Fernandez-Triana & Boudreault, 2016
 Promicrogaster liagrantae Fernandez-Triana & Boudreault, 2016
 Promicrogaster luismendezi Fernandez-Triana & Boudreault, 2016
 Promicrogaster madreanensis Fernandez-Triana, 2019
 Promicrogaster merella Nixon, 1965
 Promicrogaster miranda Muesebeck, 1958
 Promicrogaster monteverdensis Fernandez-Triana & Boudreault, 2016
 Promicrogaster munda Muesebeck, 1958
 Promicrogaster naomiduarteae Fernandez-Triana & Boudreault, 2016
 Promicrogaster orsedice (Nixon, 1965)
 Promicrogaster polyporicola Muesebeck, 1958
 Promicrogaster prater Nixon, 1965
 Promicrogaster repleta (Papp, 1990)
 Promicrogaster rondeau Fernandez-Triana, 2019
 Promicrogaster ronycastilloi Fernandez-Triana & Boudreault, 2016
 Promicrogaster sebastiancambroneroi Fernandez-Triana & Boudreault, 2016
 Promicrogaster spilopterus Nixon, 1965
 Promicrogaster sterope Nixon, 1965
 Promicrogaster terebrator Brues & Richardson, 1913
 Promicrogaster tracyvindasae Fernandez-Triana & Boudreault, 2016
 Promicrogaster typhon (Nixon, 1965)
 Promicrogaster virginiana Fernandez-Triana, 2019

References

Further reading

 
 
 

Microgastrinae